The 88 is a 22-story,  residential skyscraper in downtown San Jose, California. Upon completion of the tower in 2008, the tower became the tallest building in the city, surpassing the  San Jose City Hall that was completed in 2005.

See also
List of tallest buildings in San Jose

References

External links

Office buildings completed in 2008
Skyscraper office buildings in San Jose, California